"Too Busy Thinking About My Baby" is a Motown song written by Norman Whitfield, Barrett Strong, and Janie Bradford. The song was first recorded by The Temptations as a track on their 1966 album Gettin' Ready. Eddie Kendricks sings lead on the recording, which was produced by Whitfield. Jimmy Ruffin also recorded a version with The Temptations providing background vocals in 1966. It remained unreleased until 1997.

Three years later, Motown artist Marvin Gaye recorded a cover version of "Too Busy Thinking About My Baby" as a follow-up single to his 1968 hit "I Heard It Through the Grapevine", another Whitfield/Strong composition, which was a trans-atlantic top five hit. Whitfield produced Gaye's version as well, which featured background vocals by The Andantes. The song's lyrics feature the male narrator discussing how he has "no time to discuss weather" or "think about what money can buy", because when he thinks about his woman, "I ain't got time for nothing else".

In terms of chart success, "Too Busy Thinking About My Baby" was Gaye's second biggest hit of the 1960s, after "I Heard It Through the Grapevine". "Too Busy Thinking About My Baby" peaked at number four on the Billboard Hot 100 in the United States, and remained at the number one position on Billboard's Black Singles Chart for six consecutive weeks, from the weeks of, June 7 until July 12, 1969, with sales close to two million records. The single was the top-selling R&B single of the year, and also reached No. 14 on Billboard’s year-end charts. The tune was the first release from Gaye's 1969 studio album M.P.G.. The single also reached #5 in the UK Singles Chart.

Cash Box described it as a "medium paced rock effort" with a "solid vocal" and "a phenomenal production using tom-tom effectiveness to stoke up dance fan fires."

Personnel

Temptations version
 Lead vocals by Eddie Kendricks
 Background vocals by David Ruffin, Eddie Kendricks, Melvin Franklin, Paul Williams, and Otis Williams
 Instrumentation by The Funk Brothers

Jimmy Ruffin version
 Lead vocals by Jimmy Ruffin
 Background vocals by David Ruffin, Eddie Kendricks, Melvin Franklin, Paul Williams, and Otis Williams
 Instrumentation by The Funk Brothers

Marvin Gaye version
 Lead vocals by Marvin Gaye
 Background vocals by The Andantes: Jackie Hicks, Marlene Barrow and Louvain Demps
 Instrumentation by The Funk Brothers

Chart history

Weekly charts

Year-end charts

Other cover versions
 Al Kooper recorded the song (as "Too Busy Thinkin' 'bout My Baby") on his 1969 Columbia album You Never Know Who Your Friends Are.
 The Young Vandals recorded the song for the Isley Brothers' T-Neck label. It peaked at #46 on the R&B charts in 1970. On lead vocals was Damon Harris, who would replace Eddie Kendricks in the Temptations the next year.
 "Too Busy Thinking About My Baby" was also covered by the New York-based rock group Mardi Gras in the early 1970s, and released as a single on Map City Records. It climbed high up the charts across Europe in 1971–72.
 Elkie Brooks recorded the song on her 1981 hit album Pearls.
 Mark Everett recorded a cover of the song for his 1985 debut Bad Dude in Love
 In 1995, the Manhattan Transfer recorded the song for their album Tonin' with Phil Collins. This version reached 27 on the Adult Contemporary chart in the United States.  In Canada, the song reached number 58 on the pop singles chart and number six on the Adult Contemporary chart.
 A version performed by Ted Hawkins was included on his 1995 album, Songs from Venice Beach.
 The song was later covered by British pop group, Steps for ITVs MotownMania. It was the second A-side for their 2001 single, "It's The Way You Make Me Feel", and appeared on their album The Last Dance.
 Phil Collins re-recorded a cover during the sessions of his 2010 album Going Back.

References

External links
 List of cover versions of "Too Busy Thinking About My Baby" at SecondHandSongs.com

1966 singles
1969 singles
Songs written by Janie Bradford
Songs written by Barrett Strong
Songs written by Norman Whitfield
Marvin Gaye songs
The Temptations songs
Jimmy Ruffin songs
The Manhattan Transfer songs
Motown singles
Eels (band) songs
Song recordings produced by Norman Whitfield
1966 songs